"Cosmic Love" (Japanese: コズミック・ラヴ) is the third single by 1986 Omega Tribe, released by VAP on October 15, 1986. The single reached No. 3 on the Oricon charts.

The single was not included on any studio album, instead being included in the remix album Best Remix as a remix and in the greatest hits album Omega Tribe History: Goodbye Omega Tribe 1983-1991. It was also included in the DJ Special in the intro and the end. The B-side "I'll Never Forget You" was later included in their second album, Crystal Night.

Track listing

Single

Charts

Weekly charts

Year-end charts

References 

1986 songs
Omega Tribe (Japanese band) songs